DOOR (deafness, onychodystrophy, osteodystrophy, and mental retardation) syndrome is a genetic disease which is inherited in an autosomal recessive fashion. DOOR syndrome is characterized by mental retardation, sensorineural deafness, abnormal nails and phalanges of the hands and feet, and variable seizures. A similar deafness-onychodystrophy syndrome is transmitted as an autosomal dominant trait and has no mental retardation. Some authors have proposed that it may be the same as Eronen Syndrome, but since both disorders are extremely rare it is hard to make a determination.

Signs and symptoms 

Not all of the DOOR symptoms are consistently present. They can vary in severity, and additional features can be noted in individuals affected by DOOR syndrome.

Some of these additional features are:
 Polyhydramnios (increased amniotic fluid during pregnancy) and increased nuchal fold during pregnancy
 Specific facial features such as a large nose
 Severe and sometimes refractory seizures, abnormalities on the magnetic resonance imaging of the brain
 Increased 2-oxoglutaric acid in the blood and urine - this compound is made or used by several enzymes
 Finger-like thumbs
 Visual impairment
 Peripheral neuropathy (nerves conducting sensation from extremities to the brain) and insensivity to pain

Intellectual impairment is present in all reported cases, but the severity can vary widely. The prognosis in terms of survival also varies greatly from early childhood until adulthood.

Cause 

The recurrence of DOOR in siblings and the finding of DOOR syndrome in a few families with consanguinity suggest that the condition is an autosomal recessive genetic condition. Mutations in TBC1D24 have been identified in 9 families.

Diagnosis

Treatment

References

External links 

Autosomal recessive disorders
Genetic disorders with OMIM but no gene
Syndromes with intellectual disability
Syndromes with sensorineural hearing loss
Rare syndromes